Capodistria or Capo d'Istria may refer to:

 Giovanni Capo d'Istria or Capodistria, the Italian name of the Greek statesman Ioannis Kapodistrias
 Capo d'Istria or Capodistria, the Italian name of the city of Koper

de:Kapodistrias
ru:Каподистрия